Phillip Island Airport  is a small private airport on Phillip Island, Victoria, Australia.

See also
 List of airports in Victoria

References

Airports in Victoria (Australia)
Heliports in Australia